The Aerodrome of Casarrubios del Monte,  is a Spanish private aerodrome located in the town of Casarrubios del Monte (Toledo). The aerodrome is managed by the company Aerohobby.

It is a non-controlled aerodrome where the traffic (with radio) has to be separated using the Radio frequency of 123.500.

It is used for general aviation and is widely used also for the training schools from the Madrid Cuatro Vientos Airport, mainly for touch-and-go landing training.

Services of the aerodrome 
The aerodrome has different services.

Refueling 
Different types of fuel are served
 JET-A1
 Unleaded fuel 95
 AVGAS 100LL

Hangars and taxiing 

There are different types of hangars and taxy areas available at the buildings close to the runway.

Holding pattern 

There are two holding patterns, one at the north of the runway and another one at the south. General aviation aircraft and ultralights with radio operate at the north of the aerodrome and the Autogyro operate at the south.

See also 
Madrid-Cuatro Vientos Airport
List of airports in Spain

References 

Aerodromes
Province of Toledo